Xenia Township is one of twelve townships in Clay County, Illinois, USA.  As of the 2010 census, its population was 658 and it contained 305 housing units.

Geography

Cities, towns, villages
 Xenia

Unincorporated towns
 Greendale
(This list is based on USGS data and may include former settlements.)

Cemeteries
The township contains these four cemeteries: Camp Ground, Independent Order of Oddfellows, Salem and Toliver.

Major highways
  US Route 50

Demographics

School districts
 Flora Community Unit School District 35

Political districts
 Illinois' 19th congressional district
 State House District 108
 State Senate District 54

References
 

 United States Census Bureau 2007 TIGER/Line Shapefiles
 United States National Atlas

External links
 City-Data.com
 Illinois State Archives

Townships in Clay County, Illinois
Townships in Illinois